The R703 is a Regional Route in South Africa.

Route
Its western terminus is the R64 just east of Dealesville. From there, it heads east to the town of Soutpan. Just outside Soutpan, it crosses the R700 at a staggered intersection. Continuing east, it receives the north-westerly R718 just before reaching Brandfort, where it crosses the R30 at another staggered intersection. From Brandfort, the route initially heads east, reaching a t-junction. The R703 continues along the intersecting road, heading south-east, while the other road is unsigned and heads to Winburg. The south-eastern R703 crosses the N1 to reach Verkeerdevlei. Leaving the town, it maintains its direction coming to Excelsior. Here it forms a staggered intersection with the R709 and leaves the town heading east. The route ends at Clocolan, at an intersection with the R708.

From Dealesville till the intersection with R700, approximate 35 kilometers, the road is a gravel road in not so good condition (corrugated road in many sections). With other road between Dealesville and Bultfontein also not paved as well, driving from Kimberley to Welkom or Kroonstand means having to use some of these gravel roads. The alternatives are taking the start of R59 from R64 through Herzogville/Hoopstad/Odendaalsrus or taking the much longer R64 via Bloemfontein.

References 

Regional Routes in the Free State (province)